Chi Epsilon is an American civil engineering honor society.  It honors engineering students in the United States who have exemplified the "principles of scholarship, character, practicality, and sociability...in the civil engineering profession."  There are currently 141 chapters, of which 137 are active, where over 125,000 members have been inducted. Chi Epsilon is a 501c(3) non-profit organization, with Platinum Certification by www.guidestar.org. As of Feb 2022, Chi Epsilon does not have an active President, Executive Director, or Board of Directors, and its website is unavailable pending restructuring by the remaining members of Chi Epsilon's National Council.

Purpose 
According to the Constitution and Bylaws of Chi Epsilon, this organization is "dedicated to the purpose of maintaining and promoting the status of civil engineering as an ideal profession."  Its objective and purpose is to uphold competence, sound engineering, good moral judgement, and a commitment to society in order to improve the civil engineering profession.

History 
The society was founded on May 20, 1922 at the University of Illinois at Urbana–Champaign when two groups of civil engineering students independently petitioned for establishment of an honorary fraternity. As soon as the local organization was on its feet, plans were put into motion to bring Chi Epsilon to the national level. On February 23, 1923, a certificate of incorporation was issued by the State of Illinois. When a second chapter was established at the Armour Institute of Technology on March 29, 1923, Chi Epsilon truly became a national society. Rapid expansion soon after resulted in a total revision of government. The society is now governed by student officers at each chapter who act through a National Council. The headquarters are located at the University of Texas at Arlington. The society's English motto is "Conception, Design, Construction", which retains the letters of Chi Delta Chi, the proposed name for the fraternity which was offered by one of the original petitioning groups.

Insignia 
The colors of Chi Epsilon are purple and white.  The official badge is a key made in the likeness of the front of an engineer's transit, the instrument of a surveyor.  The official news publication of Chi Epsilon is also called The Transit, and is published semi-annually in the spring and fall of each year.

National Honor Members 

Milo Ketchum (1931 Illinois)
Charles B. Breed (1932 MIT)
Ora M. Leland (1932 Minnesota)
Arthur N. Talbot (1932 Illinois)
Daniel W. Mead (1932 Cornell)
John B. Babcock III (1932 MIT)
Herbert S. Crocker (1934 Colorado)
Frederick E. Turneaure (1936 Wisconsin)
Charles Derleth, Jr. (1936 California)
George T. Seabury (1939 MIT)
Hardy Cross (1940 MIT)
John L. Savage (1946 CO-Boulder)
Julian Hinds (1948 Texas)
Lewis A. Pick (1948 VPI)
Charles G. Hyde (1950 MIT)
David B. Steinman (1960 CCNY)
Tom A. Blair (1952 Colorado)
Sinclair O. Harper (1952 California-Berkeley)
Henry T. Heald (1953-IIT)
Morton O. Withey (1954 Wisconsin)
Bernard A. Etcheverry (1954 California-Berkeley)
Bertram D. Tallamy (1958 RPI)
Enoch R. Needles (1965 MO-Rolla)
Clarence L. Eckel (1966 Colorado)
A. M. Rawn (1968 USC)
Ellis L. Armstrong (1968 NCE)
Mason G. Lockwood (1968 Texas)
Solomon Cady Hollister (1969 Purdue)
William H. Wisely (1969 Illinois)
George R. Rich (1970 Worcester)
Abel Wolman (1971, Drexel)
Louis R. Howson (1972 Wisconsin)
John A. Focht, Sr. (1972 Texas)
Roland P. Davis (1972 West Virginia)
Daniel V. Terrell (1973 Kentucky)
Leif J. Sverdrup (1976 MO-Rolla)
Ralph E. Fadum (1978 Purdue)
Phil M. Ferguson (1980 Texas)
Oscar S. Bray (1982 Northeastern)
Ralph B. Peck (1984 Illinois)
Hunter Rouse (1985, Illinois)
Linton E. Grinter (1986 Florida)
Leland J. Walker (1988 Montana State)
William McCoy Sangster (1990 Iowa)
Stephen Bechtel, Jr. (1990 Purdue)
Fred J. Benson (1992 Texas A&M)
Jack Cermak (1994, Colorado State)
Chester P. Seiss (1994 Illinois)
Mario Salvadori (1996 Cooper Union)
T.Y. Lin (1996 California-Berkeley)
William J. Hall (1998 Illinois)
John A. Focht, Jr. (2000 Wisconsin)
Luther W. Graef (2002 Maryland)
William LeMessurier (2004 MIT)
Robert D. Bay (2006 MO-Rolla)
Charles Pankow (2006 Purdue)
Leslie E. Robertson (2008 Stevens)
Daniel S. Turner (2010 Alabama-Tuscaloosa)
G. Wayne Clough (2012 Maryland)
William F. Marcuson III (2014 University of Utah)
Conrad G. Keyes, Jr. (2016 New Mexico State University)
Norma Jean Mattei (2017 University of Louisiana – Lafayette	2017 ASCE National Convention)

Chapter list
Chapters are designated by school at which they are located.  Year of installation is in parentheses.

University of Illinois at Urbana–Champaign (1922)
Illinois Institute of Technology (1923)
University of Minnesota (1923)
University of Southern California (1924)
Cornell University (1925)
University of Wisconsin–Madison (1925)
University of California, Berkeley (1925)
Pennsylvania State University (1927)
Massachusetts Institute of Technology (1928)
University of Colorado (1929)
Purdue University (1929)
University of Missouri (1934)
University of Texas, Austin (1939)*Please Check
University of Mississippi (1937)
Auburn University (1938)
University of Iowa (1940)
Rensselaer Polytechnic Institute (1940)
Virginia Tech (1941)
Oklahoma State University (1941)
Georgia Institute of Technology (1943)
Michigan Technological University (1948)
University of Alabama (1948)
North Carolina State University (1948)
University of Utah (1948)
University of Michigan (1949)
West Virginia University (1949)
University of Connecticut (1949)
Cooper Union (1949)
Ohio State University (1949)
City College of New York (1949)
Polytechnic University of New York (1949)
Manhattan College (1949)
University of Tennessee (1949)
University of Cincinnati (1950)
Missouri University of Science and Technology (1950)
Marquette University (1950)
Colorado State University (1950)
University of Detroit (1950)
University of New Mexico (1951)
Clarkson University (1951)
Norwich University (1951)
Michigan State University (1951)
Lehigh University (1952)
Drexel University (1953)
New York University (1953)
Southern Methodist University (1955)
Yale University (1956)
Wayne State University (1957)
University of Hawaii (1957)
New Jersey Institute of Technology (1958)
Kansas State University (1960)
University of Maryland (1961)
University of Nebraska (1961)
Worcester Polytechnic Institute (1961)
South Dakota State University (1961)
Texas A&M University (1962)
University of Arkansas (1962)
University of Kentucky (1962)
Duke University (1964)
Northeastern University (1965)
Iowa State University (1965)
University of Notre Dame (1966)
Vanderbilt University (1967)
San Diego State University (1967)
University of Kansas (1967)
New Mexico State University (1968)
Louisiana State University (1968)
Lamar University (1968)
Bradley University (1969)
State University of New York at Buffalo (1969)
University of Texas at Arlington (1969)
University of Vermont (1970)
University of Pittsburgh (1970)
Rutgers University (1970)
California State University, Los Angeles (1970)
Montana State University (1971)
University of Wisconsin–Platteville (1971)
Mississippi State University (1971)
San José State University (1971)
University of Houston (1972)
California State University, Long Beach (1973)
Trine University (1973)
Clemson University (1974)
Tennessee Technological University (1975)
Texas Tech University (1975)
University of Texas at El Paso (1976)
Louisiana Tech University (1976)
University of Virginia (1977)
Syracuse University (1978)
University of Louisville (1978)
Old Dominion University (1979)
University of South Carolina (1980)
University of Maine (1980)
Villanova University (1982)
Cal Poly-Pomona (1982)
University of Colorado at Denver (1982)
Columbia University (1982)
Carnegie Mellon University (1982)
University of Oklahoma (1983)
University of Massachusetts Lowell (1983)
University of Washington (1983)
University of Miami (1984)
University of South Florida (1984)
University of Louisiana at Lafayette (1985)
University of Delaware (1985)
Arizona State University (1985)
Cal Poly, San Luis Obispo (1986)
University of California, Irvine (1988)
University of Nebraska, Omaha (1988)
University of Massachusetts Amherst (1988)
University of Rhode Island (1988)
Florida Institute of Technology (1991)
University of Central Florida (1991)
University of Toledo (1992)
University of Florida (1994)
University of California, Los Angeles (1994)
Lawrence Technological University (1994)
Rice University (1995)
University of North Carolina, Charlotte (1996)
University of Alaska Fairbanks (1996)
Southern Illinois University, Edwardsville (1997)
Bucknell University (1997)
Florida International University (1998)
University of Dayton (2000)
Stevens Institute of Technology (2000)
Washington University in St. Louis (2001)
University of Alabama, Birmingham (2003)
University of Evansville (2005)
Ohio University (2005)
University of California, Davis (2007)
Portland State University (2008)
Oregon State University (2008)
California State University, Fresno (2008)
University of Missouri, Kansas City (2009)
Texas A&M University–Kingsville (2009)
George Mason University (2010)
California State University, Fullerton (2013)
The College of New Jersey (2020)

Membership 
Undergraduate, graduate, alumni, and faculty in civil engineering are all eligible to become members provided basic requirements are met.  Undergraduates must be in the top third of their class and completed at least half of the civil engineering curriculum leading to a bachelor's degree.  The selection of members is based upon Scholarship, Character, Practicality, and Sociability, the four primary requirements of a successful engineer.  All candidates must participate in a formal initiation ceremony.  After becoming a regular member, anyone who has attained eminence through their accomplishments in the profession may become a Chapter Honor Member.  The next level of elevation is National Honor Member.

References

External links

 http://www.chi-epsilon.org/XEWebGeneral2/About/NationalHonorMembers.aspx
  ACHS Chi Epsilon entry
 Chi Epsilon chapter list at ACHS

Student organizations established in 1922
Association of College Honor Societies
Civil engineering organizations
Engineering honor societies
1922 establishments in Illinois